Seyhan is a district-municipality in the Adana Province of Turkey.

Seyhan may also refer to:

Places
 Seyhan, Seyhan, a village in the district of Seyhan, Adana, Turkey
 Seyhan Dam, a hydroelectric dam on the Seyhan River
 Seyhan Rotary Anadolu Lisesi, a high school in Turkey
 Seyhan River, a river in Turkey
 Seyhan, Iran, a village in Khuzestan Province, Iran

People

Given name
 Seyhan Arman (born 1980), Turkish transgender rights activist, actress, and drag queen
 Seyhan Erözçelik (1962-2001), Turkish poet
 Seyhan Gündüz (born 1980), Turkish women's footballer
 Seyhan Kurt (born 1971), French-Turkish poet, writer and sociologist
 Seyhan Soylu, Turkish television director
 Seyhan Cenk Tekelioğlu (born 1973), Turkish footballer
 Seyhan Yildiz (born 1989), Swiss-born Liechtensteiner footballer

Surname
 Mustafa Hüseyin Seyhan (born 1996), Turkish footballer
 Tolga Seyhan (born 1977), Turkish footballer

Turkish unisex given names